The Board of Extension of the Methodist Episcopal Church, South, later known as Methodist Center Building is a historic building at 1115 S. 4th Street in Louisville, Kentucky.  The building was constructed in 1915 in a Classical Revival style and added to the National Register of Historic Places in 1983.

It was designed by architect Brinton B. Davis (1862-1952).

See also
 National Register of Historic Places listings in Old Louisville, Kentucky

References

Methodism in Kentucky
Properties of religious function on the National Register of Historic Places in Kentucky
Neoclassical architecture in Kentucky
Churches completed in 1915
20th-century Methodist church buildings in the United States
Office buildings in Louisville, Kentucky
1915 establishments in Kentucky
Christianity in Louisville, Kentucky
National Register of Historic Places in Louisville, Kentucky
Neoclassical church buildings in the United States
Methodist Episcopal Church, South